The Tunguska Plateau is a mountain plateau in Krasnoyarsk Krai, Siberia, Russia. It is a part of the Central Siberian Plateau. The plateau is located in largely uninhabited area, the village of Noginsk was abandoned in 2006.

The Tunguska Plateau is named after the historical name of the Evenks.

Geography  
The Tunguska Plateau is located in central Krasnoyarsk Krai. To the north it is limited by the Kureika River and to the south by the Stony Tunguska River. To the north and northeast rise the Putorana Mountains and to the east the border with the Syverma Plateau is not clearly defined. To the west the Tunguska Plateau descends quite abruptly towards the Yenisei River valley and to the southeast rises the Angara Range. The largest river having its sources in the plateau is the Bakhta, a right tributary of the Yenisei. Other rivers river flowing from it are: Erachimo, Nimde, Kochumdek, Tutonchana, Degali and Uchami (tributaries of the Lower Tunguska); and Stolbovaya and Kondroma (right tributaries of the Stony Tunguska).  

The slopes of the mountains are often stepped and river valleys tend to form deep canyons in some areas. The Lower Tunguska River crosses the plateau and divides it roughly into two halves.

Geology
Geologically the Tunguska Plateau is made up of Paleozoic sedimentary rocks with volcanic rock intrusions —mainly trap rock and tuff.

Flora and climate
The plateau is part of the East Siberian taiga ecoregion. It is entirely covered by somewhat sparse and undersized larch taiga, except on the highest summits where only mountain tundra grows. There are swamps in the river valleys. The Tunguska Plateau is located in the permafrost zone and the soil never thaws at great depths. 

The climate prevailing in the Tunguska Plateau is subarctic continental.

References

External links
Soil Cover of the North of Central Siberia
Evolution of the West Siberian Basin
Climate Changes in Siberia
Onyoko and Erachimo rivers
Central Siberian Plateau
Landforms of Krasnoyarsk Krai